The Copa América is South America's major tournament in senior men's soccer and determines the continental champion. Until 1967, the tournament was known as South American Championship. It is the oldest continental championship in the world.

Panama are not members of the South American football confederation CONMEBOL. But because CONMEBOL only has ten member associations, guest nations have regularly been invited since 1993.

Record at the Copa América

1 Ecuador 1993 was the first time nations from outside the CONMEBOL were invited.
2 United States 2016 was the first time nations from outside the CONMEBOL could qualify and host.

Copa América Centenario

Group D

Panama vs Bolivia
The two teams had met in four previous encounters, the latest being a friendly held at the Estadio Ramón Tahuichi Aguilera in Santa Cruz, which Panama won 3–1. This match marked Panama's debut in Copa América, making them the third Central American country to appear at the tournament, after Costa Rica and Honduras.

Argentina vs Panama
The two teams had met in just one previous occasion, a friendly match held at the Estadio Brigadier General Estanislao López in 2011, won by Argentina 3–1.

Chile vs Panama
The two teams had met in three previous occasions, the last being a friendly held at the Estadio Municipal Francisco Sánchez Rumoroso in Coquimbo in 2010, which Chile won 2–1.

References

External links
RSSSF archives and results
Soccerway database

Countries at the Copa América
Panama national football team